The México Por Siempre Tour was a concert tour by the Mexican singer Luis Miguel in support of his 20th studio album ¡México Por Siempre!.

The tour totaled of 150 concerts throughout the United States, Canada, Latin America and Spain and was confirmed by Billboard as the tour of the year and the most successful Latin tour worldwide.
Billboard Boxscore reported that the 2018 leg of Luis Miguel's México Por Siempre Tour run was the highest grossing Latin lour since the chart launched in 1990, and earning the hitmaker a Latin American Music Award for tour of the year. He also broke his own record performing 35 concerts in a tour at the National Auditorium in Mexico City, grossing $28.3 million from 332,867 sold seats, surpassing the 30 shows he completed with the México En La Piel Tour in 2006.

According to Pollstar, the tour grossed $115,151,674 and was attended by 1,155,629 spectators in 127 shows reported. With an estimation from 147 concerts of $134,151,674 and 1,360,029 attendance.

History

The tour started in the National Auditorium of Mexico City with 5 shows.

Awards and nominations

Tour set list

Tour dates

Cancelled shows

Band

Musical Director & guitar: Kiko Cibrian
Bass: Lalo Carrillo
Piano & Keyboards: Mike Rodriguez
Keyboards & Programming: Salo Loyo
Grand Piano: Ismael Alderete 
Drums: Victor Loyo
Saxophone: Greg Vail
Trumpet: Ramón Flores
Trombone: Alejandro Carballo
Backing vocals: Paula Peralta, Mollie Gould, Anna Berenyi (2018), Lauren Lutostanski (2019)
Mariachi: Vargas de Tecalitlán

Notes

References

External links
 Official site.

Luis Miguel concert tours
2018 concert tours
2019 concert tours